Nogometni klub Vodice Šempas, commonly referred to as NK Vodice Šempas or simply Vodice Šempas, is a Slovenian football club from Šempas. The club was founded in 1972. The club was previously known as Korotan Šempas. The club currently has only youth selections.

References

External links
Official website 

Association football clubs established in 1972
Football clubs in Slovenia
1972 establishments in Slovenia